United Nations Security Council Resolution 130, adopted on November 25, 1958, noted with regret the death of Judge José Gustavo Guerrero on October 25, 1958.  The Council then decided that in accordance with the Statute of the Court the resulting vacancy in the International Court of Justice would be resolved by an election in the General Assembly that would take place during the fourteenth session of that body.

The resolution was adopted without vote.

See also
List of United Nations Security Council Resolutions 101 to 200 (1953–1965)

References
Text of the Resolution at undocs.org

External links
 

 0130
 0130
November 1958 events